Alan Bromly (1915–1995) was a British television director and producer. Bromly also directed two feature films The Angel Who Pawned Her Harp and Follow That Horse!. Amongst the television series he worked on were Out of the Unknown. He was married to the actress June Ellis.

Selected filmography
 The Angel Who Pawned Her Harp (1954, film)
 Portrait of Alison (1955, TV series)
 The Scarf (1959, TV series)
 Follow That Horse! (1960, film)
 The World of Tim Frazer (1960, TV series)
 Z-Cars (1963, TV series)
 The Desperate People (1963, TV series)
 Melissa (1964, TV series)
 An Enemy of the State (1965, TV series)
 A Man Called Harry Brent (1965, TV series)
 Bat Out of Hell (1966, TV series)
 Take a Pair of Private Eyes (1966, TV series)
 Witch Hunt (1967, TV series)
 The Big M (1967, TV series)
 This Way for Murder (1967, TV series)
 Paul Temple (1969, TV series)
 Out of the Unknown (1969-1971, TV series)
 Crown Court (1972-1977, TV series)
 Justice (1973, TV series)
 Emmerdale (1973, TV series)
 Doctor Who (1973-1979, TV series)
 Swiss Family Robinson (1974-1976, TV series)
 Coronation Street (1977-1980, TV series)
 Crossroads (1977-1978)

References

Bibliography
 Von Gunden, Kenneth. Flights of Fancy: The Great Fantasy Films. McFarland, 2001.
 Wheatley, Helen. Gothic Television. Manchester University Press, 2006.

External links

1915 births
1995 deaths
People from Godalming
British film directors
British television directors
British television producers